Honam Expressway Branch (Honam Gosokdoroui Jiseon, 호남고속도로의지선) is an expressway in South Korea, connecting Nonsan to Daejeon. The expressway's route number is 251.

This route was origin way of Honam Expressway until August 2001.

History 

 September 28, 2001 : Gyeryong IC open
 July 25, 2013 : Yangchon Hi-pass IC open

Compositions

Lanes 
 4

Length 
 53.97 km

Speed limits
 100 km/h

List of facilities

IC: Interchange, JC: Junction, SA: Service Area, TG:Tollgate

See also
Roads and expressways in South Korea
Transportation in South Korea

External links
 MOLIT South Korean Government Transport Department

Expressways in South Korea
Roads in South Chungcheong
Roads in Daejeon